was a railway station on the Hakodate Main Line in Mori, Hokkaido, Japan, operated by Hokkaido Railway Company (JR Hokkaido). Opened in 1949, it closed in March 2017.

Lines
The station was numbered "H64".

According to the timetable of March 2009, the station was served by four northbound and four southbound trains per day. Many other trains, including two northbound and one southbound local trains per day, pass through the station.

History 
On August 1, 1949, it became . On April 1, 1987, with the privatization of Japanese National Railways (JNR), the station came under the control of JR Hokkaido, and was promoted to become a full station.

Closure
The station closed following the last day of services on 3 March 2017.

See also
 List of railway stations in Japan

References

Railway stations in Hokkaido Prefecture
Stations of Hokkaido Railway Company
Railway stations in Japan opened in 1949
Railway stations closed in 2017
2017 disestablishments in Japan